Bebearia phantasia, the fantasia, is a butterfly in the family Nymphalidae. It is found in Nigeria, Cameroon, Gabon, the Republic of the Congo and the Democratic Republic of the Congo. The habitat consists of primary forests.

The larvae feed on an unidentified dicotyledonous creeper.

Subspecies
Bebearia phantasia phantasia (southern Nigeria, western Cameroon)
Bebearia phantasia concolor Hecq, 1988 (southern Cameroon, Gabon, Congo, western Democratic Republic of the Congo)

References

Butterflies described in 1865
phantasia
Butterflies of Africa
Taxa named by William Chapman Hewitson